Maycon Carvalho Inez (born 21 July 1986) is a Brazilian football player who currently plays for Goyang Hi FC. He is known for his pace and ability to position himself inside the 18-yard box.

Career

ASA de Arapiraca & Nova Iguacu
Maycon has played for ASA de Arapiraca in the Brazilian Série B and Nova Iguacu with whom he helped reach the finals of the 2011 Guanabara Trophy scoring 5 of the club's 12 goals. He also competed in the Rio Trophy where they faced eventual champions Flamengo.

Melbourne Heart
Maycon moved to Australia, signing with A-League side Melbourne Heart. He will be the second Melbourne Heart player to wear the number 9 shirt, after former striker Gerald Sibon. He scored his first goal for Heart, in the Round 4, 1–1 draw with Sydney FC. On 6 April 2012 it was announced that he would be leaving the club for Pahang FA.

Pahang FA
Maycon was recommended by former Pahang FA player, Ante Milicic, who was assistant coach of Melbourne Heart, after Pahang was searching for a striker to partner Mohd Azamuddin Md Akil. After two successful trial matches, Pahang agreed to sign him from Melbourne Heart to help them become runner-up of Malaysian Premier League and secure promotion to Malaysia Super League. However, after Pahang FA secured promotion to Malaysian Super League 2013, "The Elephants" decided against renewing his contract for the upcoming season.

References

External links
  

1986 births
Living people
Brazilian footballers
A-League Men players
Brazilian expatriate footballers
Agremiação Sportiva Arapiraquense players
Nova Iguaçu Futebol Clube players
Sri Pahang FC players
K League 2 players
Goyang Zaicro FC players
Association football forwards
People from São Fidélis